The documentary and reality television series Deadliest Catch showcases the lives and tribulations of the men and women who work aboard crabbing and fishing vessels in the Bering Sea. As Original Productions produces the show, more than 30,000 hours of footage are captured by various boats and edited into between 10 and 21 episodes per season. Since its debut on the Discovery Channel in 2005, the show has amassed an extensive list of award nominations and wins. To date, the only fishing vessel that has appeared in all 15 seasons is the F/V Northwestern, captained by Sig and Edgar Hansen. The ship, its captains, and workers have also been featured in the pilot episode, spin-off mini-series, and several specials.

As of season 16, Deadliest Catch has received 52 Primetime Creative Arts (PCA) Emmy Award nominations, 16 of which have resulted in wins. Other award ceremonies at which the show has received nominations include the American Cinema Editors (ACE) Awards, Broadcast Music, Inc. (BMI) Film & Television Awards, Critics' Choice Television Awards, and Producers Guild of America (PGA) Awards. Deadliest Catch has also received award nominations from international ceremonies, such as the Australian Subscription Television and Radio Association (ASTRA) Awards.

For his work as sound mixer on Deadliest Catch, Bob Bronow received 33 nominations, 9 of which have resulted in wins. Series producer Thom Beers has received six nominations, one win. Bruce Hanifan has collected three wins as Deadliest Catchs composer, music producer, and sound designer.

Awards and nominations

Notes

See also 
 List of Deadliest Catch episodes

References

External links 
 

Awards and nominations
Lists of awards by television series